The 2nd Yeşilçam Awards, presented by the Turkish Foundation of Cinema and Audiovisual Culture (TÜRSAK) and Beyoğlu Municipality, honored the best Turkish films of 2008 and took place on March 3, 2009, at the Lütfi Kırdar Congress and Exhibition Hall in Istanbul, Turkey.

Awards and nominations

Best Film
 Winner:  Three Monkeys directed by Nuri Bilge Ceylan
 Autumn directed by Özcan Alper
 Alone directed by Çağan Irmak
 Cars of the Revolution directed by Tolga Örnek
 A.R.O.G directed by Cem Yılmaz

Best Director
 Winner: Nuri Bilge Ceylan for Three Monkeys
 Özcan Alper for Autumn
 Çağan Irmak for Alone
 Tolga Örnek for Cars of the Revolution
 Cem Yılmaz for A.R.O.G

Best Actor
 Winner: Onur Saylak for Autumn
 Yavuz Bingöl for Three Monkeys
 Cem Yılmaz for A.R.O.G
 Çetin Tekindor for The Messenger
 Taner Birsel for Cars of the Revolution

Best Actress
 Winner: Hatice Aslan for Three Monkeys
 Nurgül Yeşilçay for Conscience
 Demet Akbağ for O... Çocukları
 Ayça Damgacı for My Marlon and Brando
 Melis Birkan for Alone

Best Supporting Actor Award
 Winner: Altan Erkekli for O... Çocukları
 Zafer Algöz for A.R.O.G
 Ercan Kesal for Three Monkeys
 Serkan Keskin for Autumn
 Volga Sorgu for My Marlon and Brando
 Selçuk Yöntem for Cars of the Revolution

Best Supporting Actress Award
 Winner: Yıldız Kültür for Alone
 Megi Kobaladze for Autumn
 Özgü Namal for O... Çocukları
 Şerif Sezer for The Messenger
 Sele Uçer for Ara

Best Cinematography Award
 Winner: Gökhan Tiryaki for Three Monkeys
 Feza Çaldıran for Autumn
 Soykut Turan for A.R.O.G
 Hasan Gergin for Cars of the Revolution
 Mirsad Heroviç for The Messenger

Best Screenplay Award
 Winner: Ebru Ceylan, Nuri Bilge Ceylan & Ercan Kesal  for Three Monkeys
 Özcan Alper for Autumn
 Çağan Irmak for Alone
 Tolga Örnek & Murat Dişli for Cars of the Revolution
 Sırrı Süreyya Önder for O... Çocukları

Best Music Award
 Winner: Aria Müzik for Alone
 Demir Demirkan for Cars of the Revolution
 Mazlum Çimen for The Last Executioner
 Evanthia Reboutsika for The Messenger
 Zülfü Livaneli for Conscience
 Cahit Berkay for After the Rain

Digiturk Young Talent Award
 Winner: Ahmet Rıfat Şungar for Three Monkeys
 Ozan Bilen for Girdap 
 Emrah Özdemir for My Marlon and Brando
 Onur Ünsal for Cars of the Revolution
 Atakan Yağız for The Messenger

Turkcell First Film Award
 Winner: Autumn directed by Özcan Alper
 Bayrampaşa: Ben Fazla Kalmayacağım directed by Hamdi Alkan
 120 directed by Özhan Eren & Murat Saraçoğlu
 My Marlon and Brando directed by Hüseyin Karabey
  Cars of the Revolution directed by Tolga Örnek

See also
 Yeşilçam Award
 Turkish films of 2008
 2008 in film

External links
  for the awards (Turkish)

References

2009 in Turkey
2008 film awards
Yeşilçam Award
2000s in Istanbul